Del Paxton is an American emo band from Buffalo, New York.

History
Del Paxton began in 2013 with the release of an EP titled Worst. Summer. Ever. via Rochester based record label Secret Audio Club. Del Paxton signed to Topshelf Records in 2015. After signing to the label, the band announced plans to release a split with the band Gulfer, which was released in April 2015. Del Paxton's first full length, All Day, Every Day, All Night was released on March 3, 2017 on Topshelf Records.

Band members
Dylan England (vocals, guitar)
Greg McClure (drums)
Zack Schoedel (vocals, bass)

Discography
LPs
All Day, Every Day, All Night (2017, Topshelf Records)
EPs
Worst. Summer. Ever. (2013, Secret Audio Club)
Splits
Del Paxton/Gulfer (2016, Topshelf Records)

References

Musical groups from Buffalo, New York
Topshelf Records artists